Rendezvous 24 is a 1946 American drama film directed by James Tinling and written by Aubrey Wisberg. The film stars William Gargan, Maria Palmer, Patrick O'Moore, Herman Bing, Kay Connors and Kurt Katch. The film was released on May 6, 1946, by 20th Century Fox.

Plot
Following World War II a group of unrepentant German scientists scheme to detonate a radio-controlled explosion of an atomic bomb in Paris.

Cast   
William Gargan as Agent Larry Cameron
Maria Palmer as Greta Holvig
Patrick O'Moore as Agent George Timothy 
Herman Bing as Herr Schmidt
Kay Connors as Kay
Kurt Katch as Dr. Heligmann
David Leonard as Prof. Gustav Kleinheldt
John Bleifer as Becker
Henry Rowland as Otto Manfred
George Sorel as Dr. Zarig
Eilene Janssen as Anchaka Schmidt

References

External links 
 

1946 films
20th Century Fox films
American drama films
1946 drama films
Films directed by James Tinling
Films about nuclear war and weapons
Films set in Germany
Films scored by Arthur Lange
American black-and-white films
Films with screenplays by Aubrey Wisberg
1940s English-language films
1940s American films